Fate/Apocrypha is an anime television series based on the light novel series of the same title written by Yūichirō Higashide and illustrated by Ototsugu Konoe. Set in a parallel world to Fate/stay night, where the Holy Grail was found during the Third Holy Grail War and taken to Romania afterwards. It presents a war fought by two factions, Red and Black, each with seven servants summoned by seven masters. The Black faction consists of mages from the Romanian Yggdmillenia magi family, while the members of the Red faction are magi sent by the Clock Tower to acquire the Holy Grail from the Yggdmillenia. The Grail also summons an additional servant of the class Ruler, whose job is to mediate the conflict.

The adaptation is directed by Yoshiyuki Asai and produced by A-1 Pictures. The series premiered on July 2, 2017, on Tokyo MX and other channels, and ran for 25 episodes. It is written by Yūichirō Higashide, with character design by Yūkei Yamada. Music for the series is composed by Masaru Yokoyama. The series was also streamed on Netflix in Japan. Outside of Japan, the series premiered on Netflix on November 7, 2017.

"Désir" is also used as the ending theme for episode 25. From episodes 13–24, the second opening theme is "Ash" by LiSA while the ending theme is "Koe" by Asca.


Episode list

References

External links
  at the official website 

Fate/Apocrypha
Lists of Fate/stay night episodes